Metrobus is a bus operator with routes in parts of Surrey, Kent, Sussex, and Greater London. Formed through a management buyout in 1983, Metrobus was purchased by the Go-Ahead Group in September 1999.

Metrobus previously operated many routes under contract to Transport for London in south and south-east London, but following a restructure, on 1 April 2014 these were transferred to Go-Ahead London. The remaining operations were brought under the control of Brighton & Hove on 1 July 2014.

History
In February 1981 the Orpington & District bus company collapsed due to financial difficulties, and the Tillingbourne Bus Company based in West Surrey took over their operations, setting up Tillingbourne (Metropolitan) Limited. In July 1983, Metrobus Limited was formed when two directors, Gary Wood and Peter Larking, purchased the subsidiary.

The newly formed company acquired the former Orpington & District garage at Green Street Green, Orpington, along with six employees and six vehicles. Three routes were operated by Metrobus at the time it was set up: 353 (Croydon to Orpington via Coombe Road, weekday peak hours only), 355 (Croydon to Forestdale, weekday peak hours only) and 357 (Croydon to Orpington via Forestdale, Monday-Saturday, all day).

In May 1982 a 'shopper bus' service was introduced, running from Sanderstead to Bromley town centre via New Addington. In keeping with the route numbers of the former Tillingbourne services, this route was numbered 354. In October 1983 the 354 was rerouted to cut out New Addington and extend the route to Croydon. Due to requests from residents, the route also began to serve Bourne Vale, which was some distance from other bus services.

In 1986 route 355 was discontinued for short journeys between Croydon and Forestdale, and the 354 frequency increased and rerouted via Selsdon Vale (although the residents of the area refused to allow LT to put fixed bus stops in place). The route was also curtailed at Selsdon, although it was extended back to East Croydon the next year. In 1995 route 357 was withdrawn after routes 353 and 354 were re-timetabled.

Two coach operators, Southland Travel and RB Coaches, were taken over by Metrobus in October 1991 along with the ten vehicles originally owned by the companies. These coaches were used on the already existing private hire business, and to operate scheduled day trips to European destinations. In 2005, Southland Travel was purchased by Sullivan Buses, along with Polhill Garage. The business was later resold to its management.

In the summers of 1994 and 1995, Metrobus operated their 'Wealdsman' service (numbered 746) to complement the Surrey Hills weekend leisure bus network. Metrobus used a specially painted blue and yellow AEC Regal IV (RF-class) vehicle, on loan from the Wealdsman Preservation Group, for the long service between Bromley and Tunbridge Wells, connecting with other leisure services (London & Country Routemaster service 410 to Box Hill) at Westerham.

Throughout the late 1990s, Metrobus introduced other commercial routes operated under Section 3(2) of the London Regional Transport Act 1984 (later to become London Local Service Agreements), including the 351, 356 and 358. All such routes were later transferred to Transport for London in mid-2002, although the 358 still remains tendered to Metrobus as of 2012.

In September 1999, Metrobus was purchased by the Go-Ahead Group.

Routes 353 and 354 were altered due to the opening of Croydon Tramlink on 20 May 2000. Both routes were transferred to standard TfL contract; the 353 was withdrawn between Addington Village and Croydon, and the 354 (renumbered T33 to reflect its new status as a Tramlink 'feeder' route) was withdrawn between Addington and Bromley.

Metrobus is the operator of the Fastway guided bus network in Gatwick and Crawley which opened in September 2003 in order to reduce congestion on the roads around Crawley by encouraging people to take the bus instead of using their cars.

On 8 December 2007, Metrobus took over the operations of First London's Orpington garage. All the staff and 35 vehicles were included, although the garage itself was closed, with the 'R' prefix routes transferring to the Orpington garage, and the T32 going to Croydon.

Routes 526/527 were lost in a Surrey County Council contract to Southdown PSV in January 2008 although regained in September 2012, and Route 100 (Maidenbower - Redhill) became part of the Fastway Network in Spring 2008.

In September 2009 it was announced that from 3 October 2009, Metrobus would take over Arriva Guildford & West Surrey's Horsham operations, including Horsham town routes, route 93 (Dorking - Horsham) and London Buses route 465 (Dorking - Kingston). Metrobus purchased 19 buses as part of the sale and moved operations away from Arriva's site at Warnham to their existing depot in Crawley.

On 1 April 2014, Go-Ahead restructured the business with the management of the Transport for London contracted services passing to the control of Go-Ahead London, with the remaining services administered by Brighton & Hove from 1 July 2014. Both continue to trade under the Metrobus brand.

Incidents
In March 2003, two Metrobus vehicles were involved in a fatal accident at Crawley bus station. A bus crashed into the back of another bus and mounted the kerb where passengers were waiting. As a result of the impact, one woman was killed and five others injured. Metrobus described themselves as "devastated" by the accident, and said it was their "first major incident".

On 8 January 2011, one of Metrobus' vehicles was hijacked while in service in Merstham. The bus was empty having just dropped off the last passengers, and the bus driver managed to escape unharmed, along with the cash box the hijackers had tried to steal. The hijacked bus was then driven through the area, striking a number of parked cars and signs, before being reversed into another Metrobus vehicle which was in service with passengers. There were no injuries, but the road was closed for a number of hours while the police investigated. Two men, aged 23 and 25, were arrested. One was released on bail and the other was charged with seven separate offences.

On Saturday 13th August 2022, vehicle number 6559 burst to flames after a collision on the A24 in Ashington just north of Worthing while on the route 23. Two people were taken to hospital and the vehicle was scrapped shortly after.

Fleet
As of August 2022, the Metrobus fleet consisted of 135 buses.

Fleet livery

Metrobus initially had a blue and yellow livery. This was superseded by a two-tone blue livery in the early 2000s.

The majority of Crawley buses featured a light blue base with a dark blue roof which swoops down at the front. It also has a white stripe separating the roof from the base, and a light blue lower dash panel. The Fastway livery is a silver base with navy blue cantrail panels and a navy blue lower front panel. Some older buses feature light blue with a dark blue roof and skirt panels along with a dark blue lower dash panel.

Most buses had a blue, red and orange oblong shapes on the seats, or "sails", however buses are now getting refurbished with Crawley's "Blue Moon" moquette now becoming standard on all Metrobus buses. Fastway buses have a slightly different moquete, with the letters "fw" sewn into the fabric, along with dark grey vinyl inserts.

In 2015 Metrobus unveiled a new livery featuring a bright blue front with a dark blue rear separated with a yellow swoop with a dark blue panel on the front. This livery has since become the cooperate livery of Metrobus. The new livery also featured a new moquete with predominantly blue with light blue circles and yellow dots

Garage
Metrobus operates from a garage in Crawley.

Crawley (CY)

History
Following the decision by Arriva to discontinue its operations in Crawley and most of East Surrey and West Sussex in March 2001, Metrobus purchased Arriva's premises in Crawley, moved the company headquarters (along with all non-London routes) there and began to develop a commercial bus network in the town.

In October 2009, Arriva sold their Horsham bus operations to Metrobus. Metrobus took over operation of various Horsham town routes, route 93 to Dorking and London Buses route 465 which is run under contract to Transport for London. Operations moved to Metrobus' existing depot in Crawley, away from the previous garage in Warnham which closed. All of Arriva's single deckers based at Warnham transferred to Metrobus. Six Alexander Dennis Enviro200s used on the 465 continued on that route. Six Dennis Dart SLF/Plaxton Pointers were kept and were refurbished internally and repainted (390, 393, 394, 395, 396 and 398), these are currently being used on route 93 between Dorking and Horsham; and a further six (388, 399, 397, 389, 391 and 392) being sold on to other operators. A solitary Volvo Olympian/Northern Counties double-decker remained in operation with Arriva.

On 30 June 2012, route 465 passed to Quality Line. During August 2013, new Wright Eclipses with Volvo chassis have been ordered as a replacement for the ageing Scania OmniCitys currently employed on the Crawley Fastway. This will displace the Scanias to other "country" workings and facilitate the retirement of the remaining unrefurbished Caetano Nimbuses, whose refurbishments were cancelled. 10 Alexander Dennis Enviro200s were ordered to replace the non-DDA compliant Darts, in order to both modernise the fleet and to comply to new legislation by 2016. These entered service in March 2015.

In August 2016, Metrobus transferred 5 (out of a total of 31) Scania OmniCity double deckers from Brighton & Hove to allow route 400 to be converted to double-deck operation. The other 26 arrived between November 2017 and June 2018 and this allowed retirement of all but two of the ageing dual door Scania OmniDekkas.

In January 2017, 17 new Wright StreetLites entered service. These are used on routes 2, 4, 5 and Fastway Route 100. Ten more Streetlites were delivered in May 2019, with 1 second hand Enviro 200 acquired in January 2020 to replace an accident damaged StreetLite. 2 more Enviro 200s arrived in March 2020 for the newly acquired E9 and E10 local routes in Epsom.

Metrobus received a fleet of 6 Wright Eclipse Gemini 2 bodied Volvo B9TL in December 2020, once again from Brighton & Hove. Numbered 6901 to 6906, they are currently mainly used on route 420.

Metrobus have ordered 20 new Wright GB Kite Hydroliner hydrogen buses for use on Fastway routes.

Bus types in use
Volvo B7RLE and B8RLE / Wright Eclipse 2/3 for Crawley Fastway
Scania OmniDekka and OmniCity, both double-deck 10.6m and single-deck 10.9m & 12.0m
Dennis Dart SLF 8.8m  with Plaxton Mini Pointer bodywork.
Alexander Dennis Enviro200 Dart, in 10.2m & 10.8m lengths
Wright StreetLite 10.8m and 11.5m.
Volvo B9TL / Wright Eclipse Gemini 2

Former garages

Metrobus operated two depots that operated Transport for London contracted services. On 1 April 2014 in a reorganisation of the business, these were brought under the control of Go-Ahead London.

Croydon (C)
Croydon garage operated London bus routes 119, 127, 202, 293, 359, 405, 434 and 455.

History 
The Beddington Lane depot was opened by Metrobus in December 2005 to house route 127 which had been surrendered early by Centra. Work was completed on the garage buildings in February 2006. This garage took over the London routes that ran from Godstone with the exception of the 146 and 246 which moved to Orpington.

On 19 May 2012, route T33 passed to Abellio London and route 54 was transferred to this garage.

Orpington (MB)

The Green Street Green garage operated London bus routes 119 (night service only on this 24-hour route), 126, 138, 146, 161, 162, 181, 233, 284, 320, 336, 352, 353, 358, 464, B14, R1, R2, R3, R4, R6, R8, R9, R11, and school route 654.

History
A former farm, Green Street Green depot was for many years the only garage for all of Metrobus' London tendered routes since the award of route 61 in 1986. More recently routes have been operated from Godstone and in December 2005 a new depot was constructed in Croydon to cope with new tender awards. During mid-2005 major reconstruction started on the Green Street Green site to make improvements and provide an expansion. During these works, a temporary base was being used at Polhill in next to the base of what was Southlands Travel.

On 23 February 2013, Metrobus commenced operating route 233, later commencing their operations of route 126 in March of the same year.

References

External links

Company website
Showbus double gallery
Showbus single deck gallery

Bus operators in Brighton and Hove
Bus operators in East Sussex
Bus operators in Kent
Bus operators in Surrey
Transport in Crawley
Bus operators in West Sussex
Go-Ahead Group companies
London bus operators
Organisations based in Crawley
Transport companies established in 1983
1983 establishments in England